Craigavon may refer to:

 Craigavon, County Armagh, a planned town in Northern Ireland 
 Craigavon Borough Council, 1972–2015 local government area centred on the planned town
 Viscount Craigavon, title in the Peerage of the United Kingdom
 James Craig, 1st Viscount Craigavon (1871–1940) first Prime Minister of Northern Ireland, namesake of the planned town
 Craigavon, Alberta, a locality in Strathcona County, Alberta, Canada

See also
 Craigavon Bridge, Derry, County Londonderry, Northern Ireland
 A.F.C. Craigavon, former football club based in the planned town
 Craigavon City F.C., football club